Andrzej Tychowski (born October 5, 1981) is a retired Polish footballer who played as a centre back..

References

1980 births
Living people
Polish footballers
People from Żary
Promień Żary players
Drøbak-Frogn IL players
Polish expatriate footballers
Expatriate footballers in Norway
Polish expatriate sportspeople in Norway
KSZO Ostrowiec Świętokrzyski players
Widzew Łódź players
Pogoń Szczecin players
Sportspeople from Lubusz Voivodeship
Association football defenders
Polish football managers